Hey Tea is a Chinese tea drink chain founded in 2012 and headquartered in Nanshan District, Shenzhen. Started off as a small tea store called "royal tea” (皇茶) in Jiangmen city, Guangdong Province, the brand quickly expanded into other cities in Guangdong and China. Due to a trademark issue, the original name "Royal Tea" was dropped and "Hey Tea" (喜茶) was adopted. , Hey Tea operates 650 stores in China and 4 stores in Singapore.

Hey Tea is commonly regarded as a "Wanghong" brand in China because its popularity on social media. The brand is famous for its modern interior design, photogenic packaging and innovative drinks. , millennials are its main customer demographic. As of that year, most locations are in shopping malls catering to wealthy customers. Its signature items are various cheese tea and fruit tea. The cheese mixture used in their signature cheese tea is described as "a blend of New Zealand's Anchor cheese, milk, cream and salt".

History
It opened in 2012 as Royal Tea in Jiangmen, but changed its name as it did not establish a trademark. It adopted its current name in 2016.

In 2015, Hey Tea entered the market of Guangzhou and Shenzhen which are two first-tier cities in China.

In 2016, after obtaining the investment of 100 million yuan from IDG Capital and Angel investor, Hey Tea entered the market of Guangxi.

In 2017, Hey Tea entered Shanghai. The first store which was opened at Raffles City created buzz on social networking because of long lines. In the same year, its bakery brand "Hey Tea Mix" opened the first store in Guangzhou.

In 2018, The first Hong Kong store was opened at New Town Plaza. Subsequently, Hey Tea opened stores at Hong Kong Times Square, Hysan Place, Yuen Long Yoho Mall, and Citywalk.

In addition, Hey Tea has branches in most first and second-tier cities of China, as well as in Singapore.

In 2021, Hey Tea released a milk-tea based product based on Eisbock milk.

Business model 
Hey Tea only operates corporate owned stores and does not have any franchisees.

Stores

Types of stores

 Standard Stores
 Hey Tea Lab: a Lab-style concept store. The first store was opened at Shenzhen Central town Square in October 2016.
Hey Tea Black: a black and gold themed store. The first store was opened at Shenzhen Mixc in January 2017.
Hey Tea Mix: a store that mainly sells freshly baked bread. The first store was opened in March 2017 in Guangzhou.
Hey Tea Pink: a pink themed store that targets at young women. The first store was opened at Shenzhen Mixc in September 2017.
Hey Tea DP: a store that originates from HEYTEA Daydreamer Project. The store had a cross-border cooperation with independent designers. The first store was opened at Shenzhen Uniwalk in October 2017.
Hey Tea Go: a small size store that customers can order online through Hey Tea Go App.

Classic products 

Original Cheese Tea Series
 Fresh Fruit Tea Series
Light Cheezo Tea Series
 Season Limited Tea Series

Controversies

Food safety issues 
In 2019, 10 brands of pearl milk tea, including Hey Tea, were found to contain caffeine at an average level of 258 mg/kg. Each cup of Hey Tea's milk tea product contains as much caffeine as 3.5 cans of red bull.

In the same year, a pregnant woman in Suzhou attracted public and media attention when she drank a fly from a drink at the Hey Tea store in Yuanrong, Suzhou . After failing to negotiate with Hey Tea, she appealed to the media and reported to the regulatory authorities. On May 31, the store was closed down by local regulatory authorities because of the internal environmental issue. However, another Suzhou Hey Tea store was closed for the same reason on the same day as the closure of the Yuanrong store.

In addition, tableware hygiene in Hey Tea store has also been exposed unqualified. Recently, in one of the Hey Tea stores in Xiamen, the supervision personnel found that there was too much water on the kitchen's floor, fruits and other materials did not meet the storage requirements. Also, the inspection showed that the containers containing the fruits had a serious ATP index exceeding the prescribed standard.

Violent dispute 
A netizen revealed that Hey Tea staff in Jinan beat a takeaway rider, and posted a live video online, triggered hot discussion on the internet. From the video, the staff of Hey Tea had a physical conflict with the rider and some people even picked up chairs and other equipment during the conflict. Later, the explanation said that at around 13:00 on September 14, the dispute between Hey Tea staff and a takeaway rider was due to a misunderstanding when taking the products.

References

External links

 Hey Tea
 Hey Tea 
   at Sohu - Chinese name of the publication: "武汉商业观察"
 HEYTEA Singapore 喜茶 - China's Most Popular Cheese Tea Shop At ION Orchard. November 9, 2018.
 How is that strange cup of HeyTea cheese tea made?. CNA Lifestyle. November 22, 2018.

Companies based in Shenzhen
Restaurants established in 2012
Tea companies of China
Jiangmen
Bubble tea brands